According to the 2001 census, the Scheduled Tribes population as in percentage of the total population of Assam was 12.4 percent. The Assam Tribune reported in 2009 that the tribal communities of Assam now officially account for 15.64 percent of the total population.

The Constitution of India categorizes the tribes of Assam into two groups: Scheduled Tribes (Hills) and Scheduled Tribes (Plains). Since hills tribes living in the plains and plains tribes living in the hills in large numbers are not recognised as scheduled tribes in the respective places, the census data may not reflect the correct figures. The Assam Tribune has claimed that if these categories of tribes are counted the actual population. Assamese language is used as the lingua franca by almost all the tribes.

Groups
The main Scheduled Tribes (Plains) are Bodo
, Deori, Sonowal, Mising, Hajong, etc and Karbi, Dimasa etc has Scheduled Tribes (hills) status.

List of tribes 

 In the autonomous Districts of Karbi Anglong and North Cachar Hills.
 Chakma
 Dimasa, Kachari
 Garo
 Hajong
 Hmar
 Khasi, Jaintia, Synteng, Pnar, War, Bhoi, Lyngngam
 Lakher
 Man (Tai speaking)
 Karbi
 Pawi
 Syntheng
 Lalung
 Any Mizo (Lushai) tribes
 Any Naga tribes
 Any Kuki tribes

 In the State of Assam including the Bodo land territorial Areas District and excluding the autonomous districts of Karbi Anglong and North Cachar Hills:

 Barmans in Cachar
 Boro, Borokachari
 Deori
 Hojai
 Kachari, Sonwal
 Lalung
 Mech
 Miri
 Rabha
 Dimasa
 Hajong
 Singhpho
 Khampti
 Garo

References

 
People from Assam